Mount Trusmadi or Trus Madi is a mountain located at the Interior Division of Sabah, Malaysia.

Geology 
The mountain geology comprises tertiary formation of mudstone, shale and argillite with subordinate beds of quartzite, sandstone, siltstone and limestone breccias.

Biodiversity 
The mountain area is located within the Trusmadi Forest Reserve where it supports a wide range of unique flora and fauna, including Nepenthes macrophylla, a species of pitcher plant. The natural hybrid Nepenthes × trusmadiensis is named after the mountain. In 1999, a small-scale expedition on the mountain biodiversity was conducted through a collaboration between Sabah Museum and Louisiana State University Museum of Natural Science with various bird species are found within the area.

Features 
It is one of Sabah's ecotourism and mountain climbing destinations. There are three climbing trails towards the mountain summit, namely from Wayaan Kaingaran (Tambunan), Wayaan Mastan (Keningau) and Wayaan Mannan (Sinua, Sook, Keningau). Both Wayaan Kaingaran and Mastan are accessible only with 4WD while Wayaan Mannan has a good access road.

References 

Trusmadi
Protected areas of Sabah
Hiking trails in Malaysia
Trusmadi
Borneo montane rain forests